Fətullaqışlaq (also, Fatullakyshlak and Fatulla-Kishlak) is a village and municipality in the Jalilabad Rayon of Azerbaijan.  It has a population of 390.

References 

Populated places in Jalilabad District (Azerbaijan)